German submarine U-61 was a Type IIC U-boat of Nazi Germany's Kriegsmarine that served in the Second World War. It was built by Deutsche Werke AG, Kiel. Ordered on 21 June 1937, it was laid down on 1 October as yard number 260. It was launched on 15 June 1939 and commissioned on 12 August under the command of Oberleutnant zur See Jürgen Oesten.

U-61 was initially assigned to the 5th U-boat Flotilla during its training period, until 1 January 1940, when it was reassigned to the 1st flotilla for a front-line combat role. It then joined the 21st flotilla as a 'school' or training boat in November 1940 where it remained for the rest of the war.

It was scuttled at Wilhelmshaven on 5 May 1945.

Design
German Type IIC submarines were enlarged versions of the original Type IIs. U-61 had a displacement of  when at the surface and  while submerged. She had two shafts and two  propellers.

U-61 was fitted with three  torpedo tubes at the bow, five torpedoes or up to twelve Type A torpedo mines, and a  anti-aircraft gun. The boat had a complement of 25.

Service history

First, second, third and fourth patrols
The U-boat began her first patrol in the North Sea, keeping to the Norwegian side. She departed Kiel on 24 October 1939 and returned there on 14 November. It was uneventful.

Her second effort started in Kiel on 28 November 1939 but finished in Wilhelmshaven on 3 December.

Patrol number three was the reverse of number two - starting from Wilhelmshaven and finishing in Kiel.

Her fourth patrol continued the start/finish changing; starting in Kiel on 15 January 1940 and was terminated in Wilhelmshaven on the 30th.

Fifth, sixth, seventh and eighth patrols
U-61s fifth sortie was marked by the sinking of the Sangstad east of Kirkwall (in the Orkney Islands), on 18 February 1940. It took place in the vicinity of the Orkney and Shetland Islands between 18 and 20 February.

Her sixth patrol was uneventful, but her seventh foray included a brief stop in the Norwegian port of Bergen, before moving through the gap between the Faroe and Shetland Islands to the waters almost between mainland Scotland and the Western Isles. The return journey was the reverse of the outbound. At 27 days, it was also her longest patrol. She docked in Kiel on 7 May.

U-61s eighth patrol involved moving slightly further south off the western Northern Irish coast. She returned to Bergen on 1 July 1940.

Ninth patrol
For her ninth patrol she departed Bergen on 6 July 1940 and sank Alwaki on the tenth. But they did create holes large enough to allow the water in. The vessel sank about eleven hours after being hit. The Admiralty investigation into the sinking wrongly concluded that the ship had been sabotaged.

U-61 returned to Kiel, arriving on the 25th.

Tenth and eleventh patrols
The boat's tenth patrol involved negotiating the Faroer/Shetland gap once again before docking at Lorient in occupied France on 15 September 1940.

Her eleventh and final war patrol was in the other direction. She arrived at the port where she had commenced her war career, Kiel, on 10 October 1940.

Summary of raiding history

References

Bibliography

External links
 

German Type II submarines
U-boats commissioned in 1939
World War II submarines of Germany
1939 ships
Ships built in Kiel
Operation Regenbogen (U-boat)